Arbutus may refer to:

In botany
 Arbutus, a genus of trees in the family Ericaceae
 Arbutus menziesii or Pacific Madrone, commonly known as Arbutus in British Columbia
 Epigaea repens, known as arbutus or trailing arbutus, a wild plant of the heath family
 Arbutus unedo, the strawberry tree, sometimes simply referred to as the Arbutus
 A common mistranslation from Chinese of Myrica rubra (Chinese Bayberry)

In geography
 Arbutus, Maryland, an unincorporated community in the United States
 Arbutus Beach, Michigan, an unincorporated community in the United States
 Arbutus, British Columbia, a former post office in the Cowichan Valley on Vancouver Island, British Columbia
 Arbutus Bay, a bay on the south side of Bowen Island, British Columbia
 Arbutus Cove, a cove in Saanich, British Columbia, between Ten Mile Point and Gordon Head
 Arbutus Creek, a creek in British Columbia, entering the head of Finlayson Inlet on Vancouver Island
 Arbutus Grove Provincial Park, a provincial park on the south side of Nanoose Harbour, British Columbia
 Arbutus Island, a small island near Swartz Bay on Vancouver Island, British Columbia
 Arbutus Point, a headland on Vancouver Island near Crofton, British Columbia
 Arbutus Ridge, a neighbourhood within the City of Vancouver, British Columbia
 Arbutus Summit, a mountain near Port Alberni, British Columbia, Canada

Other
 Arbutus (Aladdin), a cartoon villain from Disney's Aladdin
 Arbutus Records, a Montreal-based record label
 HMS Arbutus, various Royal Navy ships 
 HMNZS Arbutus (K403), a corvette of the Royal New Zealand Navy 1944-48